Valiyakunnu  is a town located in Malappuram district, Kerala, India.

Demographics
At the 2011 India census, Valanchery/ Kattipparuthi had a population of 35,795. Males constituted 48.86% (17,490) and females 51.13% (18,305). The number of households in Valanchery was listed as 5,926.

Notable persons
 K T Jaleel, politician and social worker
 Unni Menon, playback singer
 Shweta Menon, actress

Culture
Valanchery village is a predominantly Muslim populated area.  Hindus exist in comparatively smaller numbers.  So the culture of the locality is based upon Muslim traditions.  Duff Muttu, Kolkali and Aravanamuttu are common folk arts of this locality.  There are many libraries attached to mosques giving a rich source of Islamic studies.  Most of the books are written in Arabi-Malayalam which is a version of the Malayalam language written in Arabic script.  People gather in mosques for the evening prayer and continue to sit there after the prayers discussing social and cultural issues.  Business and family issues are also sorted out during these evening meetings.  The Hindu minority of this area keeps their rich traditions by celebrating various festivals in their temples.  Hindu rituals are done here with a regular devotion like other parts of Kerala.

Transportation
Valanchery village connects to other parts of India through National highway No.66 passes through Kuttippuram, Edappal, Ponnani and the northern stretch connects to Goa and Mumbai.  The southern stretch connects to Cochin and Trivandrum.  The nearest airport is at Kozhikode.  The nearest major railway stations are at Kuttippuram, Tirur.

Establishments and institutions

Government institutions
PHC Valanchery
PHC Vadakkumpuram
PHC Mattummal, Athavanad
PHC Kodumudi
Govt. Homoeo Dispensary, Athippatta
Govt. Ayurvedic Hospital, Athippatta
Govt. Ayurvedic Hospital, Athavanad
Govt. Ayurvedic Hospital, Puramannur
KSEB Valanchery
KSEB Sub Station Karthala
Post Office, Valanchery
Post Office, Edayoor North and Edayoor South
Post Office, Valiyakunnu
Post Office, Puramannur
Post Office, Vadakkumpuram
Post Office, Paikannur
Post Office, Thozhuvanoor
Post Office, Athavanad
Post Office, Karippol
Telephone Exchange Valanchery
KSRTC Valanchery
Sub Treassury Valanchery
Agriculture Office Valanchery
Agriculture Office Edayur
Village Offices – Valanchery, Edayoor, Athavanad, Irimbiliam

Important hospitals
CH Hospital
Karuna Hospital
Life Nursing Home
St. Thomas Hospital, Vattappara
PMS Orphanage Hospital, Athavanad
MM Hospital, Moodal
Nadakkavil Hospital,
PHC Valanchery
PHC Vadakkumpuram
PHC Mattummal, Athavanad
PHC Kodumudi
Govt. Homoeo Dispensary, Athippatta
Govt. Ayurvedic Hospital, Athippatta
Govt. Ayurvedic Hospital, Athavanad
Govt. Ayurvedic Hospital, Puramannur
Nisar Hospital Valanchery

Educational institutions

MES English medium school, Kottaram
MES college, Kottaram, Valanchery.
Raman Memorial TTI and LP school Kottaram.
VHSS Valanchery, Vaikkathur
VGHS Valanchery, Vaikathoor
VBHS Valanchery, Vaikathoor
MES HSS Irimbiliyam, Valanchery
GHSS Irimbiliyam, Valanchery
GHS Irimbiliyam Valanchery
GHSS Athavanad Valanchery
GHS Athavanad Valanchery
Brothers HSS Mavandiyur Valanchery
Brothers HS Mavandiyur Valanchery
IRHSS Pookkattiry
Govt. UP school Painkannur, Valanchery
KMA UP school, Karthala, Valanchery
AUP school, Valanchery
AMLP school Kolamangalam
AMLP school, vaikkathur
GMLP school, Valanchery
GLP school, Kattupparuthy
AMLP school, Thozhuvanur
ALP school, Thozhuvanur
ALP school, Karthala
AUP school, Vadakkumpuram
AMLP school, CK Para, Vadakkumpuram
HLP school, Edayur
GLP school, Vadakkumpuram
AMUP school, Puramannur
GPAUP school, Vendallur
AMLP school, Kottappuram
GLP school, Mankeri
ALP school, Kodumudi
HALP school, valiyakunnu
GMUP school, Karipol
GMLP school, Chottur
AMUP school, Poolamangalam
MMLP school, Chellur
ZMH school, Poolamangalam
AL HUDA English medium school, Kanhippura
GLP school, Athippatta
Majlis College, Puramannur
BEd. centre Markaz modal, Valanchery
Cochin College of Engineering and Technology

Banks and financial institutions

State Bank Of India Valanchery
State Bank Of Travencore Valanchery
Kerala Gramin Bank, Valanchery
Federal Bank Valanchery
Syndicate Bank Valanchery
Canara Bank Valanchery
Indian Overseas Bank
Valanchery Service Cooperative Bank
HDFC Bank
South Indian Bank
ICICI Bank
Catholic Cyrian Bank
Danalaxmi Bank
Punjab National Bank
Malappuram District Co-op Bank
Kottakal Urban Bank

Important temples and festivals
Kadampuzha Devi Temple
Maha Siva Temple Kattiparuthi Valanchery, Sivarathri
Mundiyan Thara Temple Kattipparuthy, Pooram
Ayyappankavu Temple Pandikasala, Pooram
Siva Temple Pandikasala Panikannur, Sivarathri
Siva Temple Manchra Valanchery, Sivarathri
Siva Temple Vaikathur Valanchery, Sivarathri
Parambathukavu Bhagavathy Temple, Pooram
Kodumudikkavu Devi Temple, Poora
Bagsvathi Temple Vaikathur Valanchery
Narasimga Temple Paticharekara Thozhuvanur
Sri Durga Temple Pattambi Road Valanchery
Ayyappa Temple Manapadi Athavanad
Mahavishnu Temple Kavungal Athavanad
Siva Temple Kavungal Athavanad
Siva Temple Mattummal Athavanad
Siva Temple Paruthi Athavanad
Devi Temple Illathumpadi Valiyakunnu
Vishnu Temple Ambal Irumbiliyam
Ayyappa Temple Vadakkumuri Valiyakunnu Irumbilyam
Thripuranthaga Temple Valiyakunnu Irumbiliyam
Devi Temple Kodumudikavu Irumbiliyam
Guruvayurappan Temple Kottappuram Irumbiliyam
Narasimnha Temple Irumbiliyam
Siva Temple Vallarethepodi Vadakkumpuram
Chathankavu Temple Vadakkumpuram
Thevar Chalsiva Temple Vadakkumpuram
Siva Temple Vallarethepodi Vadakkumpuram
Chenthuruthi Temple Chenadankolambu

Important mosques (masjid)
Pandikasala Jumamasjid
Painkannur Jumamasjid
Mukkilapeedika Masjid
Kattiparuthi Masjid
Valanchery Mujahid palli
Valanchery MES Mosque
Valanchery Jumamasjid
Mujahid palli Valanchery
Kottappuram Jumamasjid
Valayakkunnu Jumamasjid
Kodumudi Jumamasjid
Puramannur Jumamasjid
Irumbiliam Town Palli
Mechariparambil Jumamasjid
Pookkattiri Niskarapalli
Edayoor Jumamasjid
Moonnakkal palli
Karekkad Jumamasjid
Thindalam Jumamasjid
Vadakkumbram Jumamasjid
Koalmangalam Jumamasjid
Kavumpuram Jumamasjid
Kanchipura Jumamasjid
Chottur Jumamasjid
Athavanad Kattikkal palli
Kavungal jumamasjid

Important churches
Sharoon Pendhakosth Church

References

Cities and towns in Malappuram district
Kuttippuram area